Buriasco is a comune (municipality) in the Metropolitan City of Turin in the Italian region of Piedmont, located about  southwest of Turin.

Buriasco borders the following municipalities: Pinerolo, Scalenghe, Cercenasco, Macello, and Vigone.

Twin towns — sister cities
Buriasco is twinned with:

  María Juana, Argentina

References

External links
Official website 

Cities and towns in Piedmont